is a traditional Japanese New Year decoration. Sheets of paper called  folded into lightning shapes similar to those seen on sumo wrestler's belts are also attached.

 first appeared in the Muromachi period (14th–16th century). The name  ("mirror") is said to have originated from its resemblance to an old-fashioned kind of round copper mirror, which also had a religious significance. The reason for it is not clear. Explanations include mochi being a food for special days, the spirit of the rice plant being found in the mochi, and the mochi being a food which gives strength.

The two mochi discs are variously said to symbolize the going and coming years, the human heart, "yin" and "yang", or the moon and the sun. The , whose name means "generations", is said to symbolize the continuation of a family from generation to generation.

Traditionally,  were placed in various locations throughout the house.

Contemporary  are often pre-moulded into the shape of stacked discs and sold in plastic packages in the supermarket. A  or a plastic imitation  is often substituted for the original .

In some regions, three layered  are also used. There is also a variant decoration called an  placed in the centre of the kitchen or by the window which has three layers of mochi.

 are traditionally broken and eaten in a Shinto ritual called  (mirror opening) on the second Saturday or Sunday of January. This is an important ritual in Japanese martial arts dojos. It was first adopted into Japanese martial arts when Kanō Jigorō, the founder of judo, adopted it in 1884, and since then the practice has spread to aikido, karate and jujutsu dojos.

See also

Daphniphyllum

References

External links

Shinto
Festivals in Japan
Japanese New Year foods
Japanese cuisine
New Year in Japan
Japanese words and phrases